Pat Legall (9 February 1934 – 8 July 2004) was a Guyanese cricketer. He played in eleven first-class matches for British Guiana from 1954 to 1963.

See also
 List of Guyanese representative cricketers

References

External links
 

1934 births
2004 deaths
Guyanese cricketers
Guyana cricketers
Sportspeople from Georgetown, Guyana